This article presents a timeline of Philippine political history focused  on governmental transitions  of the Philippine archipelago, major polities, invasion attempts, and insurgency movements from the pre-Hispanic period to the present. The information presented here is highly summarized, and more complete information can be found in more detailed articles linked below.

Chronology

See also 
Politics of the Philippines

Prehistoric Philippines
Ancient barangays
Datus, Rajahs and Sultans
Datu Bangkaya
Datu Dinagandan
Rajah Lakandula
Rajah Humabon
Datu Lapu-Lapu
Rajah Kulambo
Rajah Sulayman
Sultan of Maguindanao
Sultan of Sulu
Datu Rodylie
Datu Ampatuan
Lapu-Lapu
Rajah Bendahara Kalantiaw III
Rajah Calambu
Raja Humabon
Rajah Lakandula
Rajah Suliman
Rajah Tupas
Sultan Kudarat
Maragtas epic
Datu Puti
Irong-irong
Kalantiao
Babaylan
Urduja
 Spanish colony
 Viceroyalty of New Spain
Miguel López de Legazpi
Guido de Lavezaris
Francisco de Sande
Gonzalo Ronquillo de Peñaloza
Diego Ronquillo
Santiago de Vera
Gómez Pérez Dasmariñas
Pedro de Rojas
Luis Pérez Dasmariñas
Francisco de Tello de Guzmán
Pedro Bravo de Acuña
Rodrigo de Vivero
Juan de Silva
Alonso Fajardo y Tenza
Fernándo de Silva
Juan Niño de Tabora
Juan Cerezo de Salamanca
Sebastián Hurtado de Corcuera
Diego Fajardo Chacón
Sabiniano Manrique de Lara
Diego de Salcedo
Juan Manuel de la Peña Bonifaz
Manuel de León
Juan de Vargas Hurtado
Gabriel de Curuzealegui y Arriola
Fausto Cruzat y Gongora
Domingo Zabálburu de Echevarri
Martín de Urzua y Arismendi
Fernando Manuel de Bustillo Bustamante y Rueda
Francisco de la Cuesta
Toribio José Cosio y Campo
Fernándo Valdés y Tamon
Gaspar de la Torre
Juan Arrechederra
José Francisco de Obando y Solis
Pedro Manuel de Arandía Santisteban
Miguel Lino de Ezpeleta
Manuel Rojo
Simón de Anda y Salazar
Francisco Javíer de la Torre
José Raón
Simón de Anda y Salazar
Pedro Sarrio
José Basco y Vargas
Pedro de Sarrio
Félix Berenguer de Marquina
Rafael María de Aguilar y Ponce de León
Mariano Fernández de Folgueras
Manuel Gonzalez de Aguilar
José Gardoqui Jaraveitia
 Crown colony
Juan Antonio Martínez
Marinao Ricafort Palacín y Ararca
Pascual Enrile y Alcedo
Gabriel de Torres
Juan Crámen
Pedro Antonio Salazar Castillo y Varona
Andrés García Camba
Luis Lardizábal
Marcelino de Oraá Lecumberri
Francisco de Paula Alcalá de la Torre
Narciso Clavería y Zaldúa
Antonio María Blanco
Antonio de Urbistondo y Eguía
Ramón Montero y Blandino
Manuel Pavía y Lay
Ramón Montero y Blandino
Manuel Crespo y Cebrían
Fernándo Norzagaray y Escudero
Ramón María Solano y LLanderal
Juan Herrera Dávila
José Lemery É Ibarrola Ney y González
Salvador Valdés
Rafael de Echaque
Joaquín del Solar É Ibáñez
Juan de Lara É Irigoyen
José Laureano de Sanz y Posse
Antonio Osorio
Joaquín del Solar
José de la Gándara y Navarro
Manuel Maldonado
Cárlos María de la Torre y Nava Cerrada
Rafael de Izquierdo y Gutíerrez
Manuel Mac-crohon
Juan Alminos y Pe Vivar
Manuel Blanco Valderrama
José Malcampo y Monje
Domingo Moriones y Murillo
Rafael Rodríguez Arias
Fernando Primo de Rivera
Emilio Molíns
Joaquín Jovellar
Emilio Terrero y Perinat
Antonio Molto
Federico Lobaton
Valeriano Wéyler
Eulogio Despujol
Federico Ochando
Ramón Blanco
Camilo Polavieja
Basilio Agustín
Mario Jaudenes
Agustin De Los Rios
José de Lachambre
Philippine Revolution
La Liga Filipina
José Rizal
Marcelo H. del Pilar
Graciano López Jaena
Mariano Ponce
La Solidaridad
 Katipunan
Andrés Bonifacio
Emilio Jacinto
Melchora Aquino

Emilio Aguinaldo
Mariano Trías
Baldomero Aguinaldo
Spanish–American War
 American territory
Philippine–American War
 US Military Government
Wesley Merritt
Elwell S. Otis
Arthur MacArthur, Jr.
Adna Chaffee

Emilio Aguinaldo
Apolinario Mabini
Pedro Paterno
Antonio Luna
Gregorio del Pilar
 US Insular Government
William Howard Taft
Luke E. Wright
Henry Clay Ide
James Francis Smith
Newton W. Gilbert
William Cameron Forbes
Francis Burton Harrison
Charles Yeater
Leonard Wood
Eugene Allen Gilmore
Henry L. Stimson
Eugene Allen Gilmore
Dwight Filley Davis
Theodore Roosevelt, Jr.
Frank Murphy

Quezon, Manuel L.
National Defense Act of 1935
Sergio Osmeña
Bell Trade Act
 Philippine Executive Commission
Masaharu Homma
Shizuichi Tanaka
Shigenori Kuroda
Jorge B. Vargas

José P. Laurel
Benigno Aquino Sr.
Benigno Ramos

 Third Republic of the Philippines
Manuel Roxas
Elpidio Quirino
Ramon Magsaysay
Carlos P. Garcia
Diosdado Macapagal
 Fourth Republic of the Philippines
Ferdinand Marcos
Imelda Marcos
Benigno Aquino Jr.
EDSA Revolution
Fifth Republic of the Philippines
Corazon Aquino
Fidel Ramos
Joseph Estrada
EDSA II
Gloria Macapagal Arroyo
Benigno Aquino III
Rodrigo Duterte
Bongbong Marcos

Notes

References

Further reading

Bibliography
.
.
.
.
 (English translation by Sulpicio Guevara).
.
. (Note: 1. The book cover incorrectly lists author as "Maximo M Lalaw", 2. Originally published in 1921 by The McCullough Printing Co., Manila.)
.
.
 This book was published by Ricarte himself, includes his memoirs on the Philippine Revolution.
.
.
.
.
.
.
.

.

 
Sovereignty